Kenneth D. Albers (born March 17, 1941) is an American former politician. He served in the South Dakota Senate from 1997 to 2004 and from 2007 to 2008.

References

1941 births
Living people
People from Lincoln County, South Dakota
Businesspeople from South Dakota
South Dakota sheriffs
Republican Party South Dakota state senators